Rex Taylor Reed (born October 2, 1938) is an American film critic, journalist, and media personality. Raised throughout the Southern United States and educated at Louisiana State University, Reed moved to New York City in the early 1960s to begin his career, writing about popular culture, art, and celebrities for a number of newspapers and magazines. He became a public figure in his own right, making regular appearances on television and occasionally acting in films throughout the 1970s and 1980s.

Reed has been a longtime writer for The New York Observer, where he authors the "Talk of the Town" column. He is known for his blunt style and contrarian tastes, and some of his writing has garnered criticism for containing factual errors or disparaging remarks about actors.

Early life
Reed was born on October 2, 1938, in Fort Worth, Texas, the son of Jewell (née Smith) and James M. Reed, an oil company supervisor. In an interview with The New York Times, Reed stated: "My mother came from a family of 10 in Oklahoma, her second cousins were the Dalton Gang. And when my grandfather was a little boy, he was rocked by Jesse James on his knee." Due to his father's profession, the family moved throughout the American South during Reed's childhood.

He earned his journalism degree from Louisiana State University in 1960. There, he began writing film and play reviews, not only for the university's newspaper, The Daily Reveille, but also for the Baton Rouge newspaper, The Morning Advocate. He moved to New York City after graduating from LSU, hoping to find success as an actor. Instead, he was hired to work at the publicity department of 20th Century Fox. In 1969, he said his job there was to "write those puffy things about Elvis Presley and—you know—Fabian, and tell everybody how great they were when I wouldn't be caught dead seeing their movies myself. [...] Cleopatra came along and rocked the company financially. We were saving on rubber bands and paying Elizabeth Taylor and Richard Burton to float down the Nile while everybody back at Fox was taking salary cuts, and I was the first one to go—the little guy at the $75 salary, the most dispensable item in the company. I was fired." Later in the decade, he provided many interviews for The New York Times and New York, which at the time was the Sunday magazine of the New York Herald Tribune. In 1966, the year in which the Herald Tribune folded, he was hired as one of the music critics for HiFi/Stereo Review (now Sound & Vision), a position at which he remained until early 1973.

Career

Film and TV appearances
Reed has acted occasionally, such as in the movie version of Gore Vidal's Myra Breckinridge (1970). Reed also appeared in the films Superman (1978, as himself), Inchon (1981) and Irreconcilable Differences (1984). He appeared frequently as a judge on the TV game show The Gong Show in the late 1970s.  Reed additionally served on the jury at the 21st Berlin International Film Festival in 1971, and guest-voiced as himself on the animated series The Critic.

Rex Reed appears in the 2009 documentary For the Love of Movies: The Story of American Film Criticism explaining how important film critics were in the 1970s, and complaining about the proliferation of unqualified critical voices on the Internet.

Critic
Before his current job as film critic for The New York Observer, Reed was a film critic for Vogue, GQ, The New York Times, and Women's Wear Daily. For thirteen years, he was an arts critic for the New York Daily News, and for five years was the film critic for the New York Post. Reed was not given a ticket to the world premiere of Last Tango in Paris at the 1972 New York Film Festival as the festival considered him a columnist for the New York Daily News, rather than a regular film critic, as well as describing him as "[not] a friend of the festival". He is a member of New York Film Critics Circle and, because his reviews appear on the Internet, a member of New York Film Critics Online. He is the author of eight books, including Do You Sleep in the Nude?, Conversations in the Raw, People Are Crazy Here, and Valentines & Vitriol.

On October 24, 1974, Reed, reviewing Frank Sinatra's performance at Madison Square Garden, called him "a Woolworth rhinestone" and wrote that "his public image is uglier than a first-degree burn, his appearance is sloppier than Porky Pig; his manners are more appalling than a subway sandhog's and his ego bigger than the Sahara (the desert, not the hotel in Las Vegas, although either comparison applies). All of which might be tolerable if he could still sing. But the saddest part of all is the hardest part to face about this once-great idol now living on former glory: the grim truth is that Frank Sinatra has had it. His voice has been manhandled beyond recognition, bringing with its parched croak only a painful memory of burned-out yesterdays." Years later, Reed recalled that Sinatra "was sloppy" and "looked like he'd slept in his clothes. Sinatra was mad at me, but what did he do? He lost 25 pounds!"

In 1986, after Marlee Matlin won the Academy Award for Best Actress for Children of a Lesser God, Reed wrote that Matlin had won because of a "pity vote", and that a deaf person playing a deaf character was not really acting.

After Marisa Tomei won an Oscar for Best Supporting Actress in 1992 for her work in My Cousin Vinny, Reed said publicly that she had not actually won the award, and that presenter Jack Palance had accidentally read the wrong name off the card he was reading. When it was pointed out that the card had only one name on it, Reed changed his theory to say that Palance had read the wrong name off the Teleprompter, and claimed the Academy went along with it because they would have been embarrassed to admit that mistake in front of a huge viewing audience. Reed was publicly rebutted by the accounting firm Price Waterhouse, who said that if a presenter ever announced the wrong winner, a PwC representative would go on stage and state that the wrong result had been announced, before either stating the correct result or giving the information to someone on stage to correct it. Roger Ebert said that Reed's conspiracy theories were false and unfair to Tomei and that Reed owed her an apology. When La La Land was incorrectly announced as the 2016 Best Picture winner instead of the actual winner, Moonlight, Price Waterhouse's actions to correct the mistake were exactly what they'd outlined when rebutting Reed's conspiracy theory. Many observers used this occasion to strongly criticize Reed for having been thoroughly exposed as a liar.

In a 2005 review of the South Korean movie Oldboy, Reed wrote, "What else can you expect from a nation weaned on kimchi, a mixture of raw garlic and cabbage buried underground until it rots, dug up from the grave and then served in earthenware pots sold at the Seoul airport as souvenirs?"  The Village Voice, which reported that "online forums erupted in protest" at the review, then mocked Reed by imagining him applying similar logic to films from other countries.

In a 2013 review of Identity Thief, Reed made several references to Melissa McCarthy's weight, referring to her as "tractor-sized", "humongous", "obese", and a "hippo". Film critic Richard Roeper said, "This just smacks of mean-spirited name-calling in lieu of genuine criticism." The review was referenced at the 85th Academy Awards on February 24, 2013, by the host, Seth MacFarlane, who joked that Reed would review Adele for singing "Skyfall" at the ceremony. In a column for The Huffington Post, Candy Spelling likened Reed's review to bullying. Reed stood by his comments and stated his objection to the use of serious health problems such as obesity as comedy talking points. He dismissed the outrage as being orchestrated for publicity, but praised McCarthy for not getting involved in the matter, calling her "completely classy".

In a 2017 review of The Shape of Water, he referred to people with disabilities as "defective creatures" and Sally Hawkins' mute character as "mentally handicapped".

Factual errors in reviews
Reed's 2012 review for The Cabin in the Woods contained significant factual inaccuracies in his summary of the film, and exhibited a dismissive attitude towards anyone who disagreed with his negative opinion. L Magazine'''s Henry Stewart noted: "his review is literally about 50 percent inaccurate—factually, objectively wrong." His professionalism was also called into question when, in addition to the factual inaccuracies, some felt he was needlessly insulting and mean-spirited towards those who enjoyed the film.

In 2013, Reed reviewed V/H/S/2, despite walking out of the film within its first 20 minutes. As a result, his review was brief and incorrectly summarized Jason Eisener's segment of the horror anthology. Some felt that Reed was unprofessional, with journalist Sam Adams stating that Reed was "making a mockery of a noble profession while intelligent critics scramble for crumbs all around him".

In 2017, Reed's review of The Shape of Water incorrectly referred to the film's writer and director Guillermo del Toro as "Benecio del Toro" (presumably based on the name of actor Benicio del Toro), and also wrote that del Toro was from Spain; neither Guillermo nor Benicio del Toro is from Spain.

The same year he included the film Get Out on his list of 10 Worst Films of 2017, and later sardonically stated in a CBS Sunday Morning interview, "I didn't care if all the black men are turned into robots." A writer on Sunday Morning''s website noted that there were no actual robots in the film.

Personal life
Reed lives in a two-bedroom apartment at The Dakota apartment building in New York City, which he bought for $30,000 in 1969.

In 2018, Reed stated, "Love is not something that I've been really good at. I think people are intimidated by people with opinions. How do you go start looking for a wife or a boyfriend or a significant other? It's too late. It would be nice, though, to find somebody who's really handy with a wheelchair, because that day is coming".

Shoplifting arrest and clearing
In February 2000, Reed was arrested for shoplifting after leaving a Tower Records in Manhattan with compact discs by Mel Tormé, Peggy Lee, and Carmen McRae in his jacket pockets. Reed, who had just purchased two other CDs, says he forgot about the other three CDs and his offer to pay for them was refused. The charges were later dropped. According to Reed, several days after the arrest, Peggy Lee sent him her entire catalog of CDs, because "she was so thrilled I wanted one of her CDs enough to put myself through so much hell".

Bibliography

Filmography

References

External links
 Rex Reed's New York Observer movie review archive
 New York Film Critics Circle biography
 

1938 births
20th-century American male actors
20th-century American male writers
20th-century American non-fiction writers
21st-century American male writers
21st-century American non-fiction writers
American film critics
American male film actors
American male non-fiction writers
Journalists from Texas
Living people
Louisiana State University alumni
Male actors from Fort Worth, Texas
New York Daily News people
New York Post people
People from the Upper West Side
Television personalities from Texas
The New York Observer people
Writers from Manhattan